Live at the Apollo, Volume II is a 1968 live double album by James Brown and The Famous Flames, recorded in 1967 at the Apollo Theater in Harlem. It is a follow-up to Brown's 1963 recording, Live at the Apollo. It is best known for the long medley of "Let Yourself Go", "There Was a Time", and "I Feel All Right", followed by "Cold Sweat", which document the emergence of Brown's funk style. It peaked at #32 on the Billboard albums chart. Robert Christgau included the album in his "basic record library" for the 1950s and 1960s.

On the original 1968 album and its 1987 CD reissue the performances were edited to accommodate the recording medium. A more complete recording of what was captured from the performances was remastered and released on a 2-CD Deluxe Edition in 2001.
The Famous Flames, (Bobby Byrd and Bobby Bennett), were credited on the record label and the back cover of the album (although not on the front). But on the original album release, their group name was cut from the live intro, because in between the time of the recording of the album and its actual 1968 release, the group members quit James Brown due to salary disputes, essentially leaving Brown as a solo act. (Famous Flame Lloyd Stallworth had left the group during 1966 for the same reasons). However, years later, on the 2001 Deluxe Edition CD release, the complete introduction by MC Frankie Crocker, including The Famous Flames' name, was restored.

This was the last live album recorded by James Brown & The Famous Flames as a group.

Track list
Times are listed from their respected CD issues; the original 1967 issue of the album is un-indexed.

Original 1968 issue
Side 1
Introduction – 0:32
"Think" – 2:54
"I Wanna Be Around" – 3:09
James Brown Thanks – 1:11
"That's Life" – 4:05
"Kansas City" – 4:49

Side 2
Medley – 14:54:
"Let Yourself Go"
"There Was a Time"
"I Feel All Right"
"Cold Sweat" – 4:43

Side 3
"Maybe the Last Time" – 3:06
"I Got You (I Feel Good)" – 0:38
"Prisoner of Love" – 7:25
"Out of Sight" – 0:26
"Try Me" – 2:54
"Bring It Up (Hipster's Avenue)" – 4:38 (includes intro of Famous Flames Bobby Byrd & Bobby Bennett)

Side 4
"It's a Man's Man's Man's World" – 11:16
"Lost Someone (Medley)" – 6:21
"Please, Please, Please" – 2:44

Notes on 1987 CD issue
The medley on Side B was tracked as three different songs:
"Let Yourself Go" – 4:01
"There Was a Time" – 4:18
"I Feel All Right" – 5:32
"It's a Man's Man's Man's World" was edited to 7:10, while "Lost Someone (Medley)" was edited to 10:17.

2001 Deluxe Edition

References

James Brown live albums
1968 live albums
King Records (United States) live albums
Albums recorded at the Apollo Theater
The Famous Flames albums